Mihai Bogdan Dobrescu (born November 30, 1976, in Ploieşti, Prahova) is a boxer from Romania, who won the silver medal in the Men's Flyweight (– 51 kg) division at the 2000 European Amateur Boxing Championships in Tampere, Finland. In the final he was defeated by Ukraine's Vladimir Sidorenko.

M.B. Dobrescu represented Romania at the 2000 Summer Olympics in Sydney, Australia. There he was stopped in the second round by Cuba's Manuel Mantilla. He failed to qualify for the 2004 Summer Olympics, finishing in third place at the 3rd AIBA European 2004 Olympic Qualifying Tournament in Gothenburg, Sweden.

References

External links
 Profile at sports-reference.com

1976 births
Living people
Flyweight boxers
Boxers at the 2000 Summer Olympics
Olympic boxers of Romania
Sportspeople from Ploiești
Romanian male boxers